Stephen Njunge Ndung'u  (born 2 January 1994) is a goalkeeper currently in the ranks of Kenyan Premier League side Nairobi City Stars. 

He previously played for Kiambu's Euronuts, National Youth Talent Academy (NYTA), FC Talanta, and Wazito F.C. 

At the close of the 2020/21 Premier league season, Njunge was named the (joint) runners-up Golden Glove winner after registering 11 clean sheets.

References

External links
 

1994 births
Living people
Kenyan footballers
Association football goalkeepers
Kenyan Premier League players
Wazito F.C. players
Nairobi City Stars players